Stephen L. Peterson (born June 27, 1963) is an American rower who was a member of the 1996 U.S. Olympic team.  He was also on the 1990 U.S. World Championships team where he won a gold medal in the Men’s Lightweight Double Scull. He has been the head coach of the Indiana University women’s rowing team since 2003.

Peterson was born in Detroit, Michigan but grew up in Cumberland, Rhode Island.

As a student at the University of Rhode Island, he was on the rowing team and was a member of the Sigma Pi fraternity. After graduating in 1985, he was an assistant coach for Rhode Island from 1986 to 1987 and became head coach from 1989 to 1991. He then took the head coaching job of the lightweight men’s crew at Rutgers University from 1992 to 1995.  He became the women’s rowing head coach at George Washington University from 1996 to 2003 where he was named Atlantic 10 Conference Coach of the Year in 2000 and 2001.  He was also a United States National Team coach from 1999 to 2003.

In 2014, he was named NCAA Division I Coach of the Year.  He was inducted into the U.S. Rowing Hall of Fame in 1999.  He is a member of the University of Rhode Island’s Athletic Hall of Fame.

References

1963 births
Living people
American male rowers
Rowers at the 1996 Summer Olympics
World Rowing Championships medalists for the United States
Olympic rowers of the United States